Selva de Mar is a Barcelona Metro and Trambesòs station located in Poblenou, Sant Martí district, Barcelona. It's located under carrer de Pujades, between carrer de Provençals and carrer de Selva de Mar, the latter being where the only entrance to the station is. The tramway station is a 2004 addition, opened that year along with other stations in the T4 route.

Services

See also
List of Barcelona Metro stations
List of tram stations in Barcelona

External links
TMB.net
Metro station from Trenscat.com
Trambesòs station from Trenscat.com

Railway stations in Spain opened in 1977
El Poblenou
Transport in Sant Martí (district)
Barcelona Metro line 4 stations